U.S. Route 23 or U.S. Highway 23 (US 23) is a major north–south U.S. Highway between Jacksonville, Florida, and Mackinaw City, Michigan. It is an original 1926 route which originally reached only as far south as Portsmouth, Ohio, and has since been extended. It was formerly part of the major highway known as the Dixie Highway. The highway's southern terminus is in Jacksonville, Florida at US 1/US 17. The northern terminus is at I-75 in Mackinaw City, Michigan.

Route description

|-
|FL
|37.67
|60.66
|-
|GA
|391.69
|630.74
|-
|NC
|109.22
|175.88
|-
|TN
|78.14
|125.83
|-
|VA
|60.91
|98.08
|-
|KY
|157.76
|253.89
|-
|OH
|234.86
|378.20
|-
|MI
|364.92
|587.63
|-
|Total
|1435.17
|2309.68
|}

Florida

U.S. Route 23 begins at U.S. Route 1 (Main Street) at the northern end of downtown Jacksonville, starting as a one-way pair, with the northbound lanes meeting with Florida State College.  It is also unsigned State Road 139 from its southern terminus to its interchange with US 1 in northwestern Jacksonville (SR 139 continues east along SR 10A from the end of US 23 to SR 115). West of I-95, US 23 ends the one-way pair, continuing as Kings Road through northwestern Jacksonville, as an off-grid road.  A few miles to the west, US 23 meets with US 1/SR 15 (Martin Luther King Jr. Parkway), becoming concurrent with the highway through the rest of its journey through Florida.  The road continues northwest, intersecting with Interstate 295 and eventually makes its way out of Jacksonville.  At Callahan, US 1/US 23 meets with U.S. Route 301, beginning a three-way concurrency as the road continues northward towards the St. Mary's River, leaving Florida and entering Georgia.

Georgia

In Georgia, US 23 enters from Florida running concurrently with US 1 and US 301 just south of Folkston. Within Homeland, US 301 branches off and US 23 continues northwesterly with US 1 as a divided four-lane highway toward Waycross where it intersects US 82.

In Hazlehurst, US 23 intersects US 221 and begins running concurrently with US 341, a divided four-lane highway designated the Golden Isles Parkway. Continuing into McRae the highway intersects US 280, US 319 and US 441. In Eastman leaves US 341 to intersect I-16 near Macon.

US 23 is two lanes from Eastman to the community of Empire, then five lanes with a center turning lane to the Cochran by-pass, which is two lanes. In Cochran, US 23 runs concurrently with US 129 Alt. North of I-16, US 23, known as Ocmulgee East Boulevard, turns on Emery Highway then turns onto Spring Street before crossing under I-75 and the Ocmulgee River. After the river, US 23 turns onto Riverside Drive and then parallels the Ocmulgee River and I-75, US 41, US 80 and leaves US 129 Alt. US 23 then crosses I-75 again and continues to Jackson.

In Henry County US 23 continues north concurrently with SR 42. US 23 follows Moreland Avenue concurrently with SR 42 in Clayton County and metro Atlanta, running for several miles in a perfectly straight and due north–south line, which is also the Fulton–DeKalb county line. The highway then turns onto Ponce de Leon Avenue, splitting from SR 42, to follow US 29, US 78 and US 278. Farther along, US 23 turns onto Clairemont Avenue and onto Buford Highway to leave metro Atlanta. In Buford, US 23 turns right onto SR 20, then onto I-985. The highway intersects US 129 in Gainesville. At the end of I-985, US 23 then continues concurrently with SR 365 north.

US 23 intersects US 123 in Cornelia and begins following US 441. In Clayton, the highway then intersects US 76.

Though US 23 roughly parallels I-75 from Macon to Atlanta, and the two routes come within a few miles in Atlanta, US 23 only intersects with I-75 at the Riverside Drive exit in Macon.  It crosses back over I-75 a few miles south. This is the only place that US 23 runs west of I-75 until many miles to the north, in Perrysburg, Ohio, (near Toledo).

North Carolina

The highway runs concurrent with US 441 between the Georgia state line and Dillsboro, then with US 74 through Waynesville as the Great Smoky Mountains Expressway, followed by US 19 through Canton and Enka-Candler. West of Asheville, the highway follows I-26 to the Tennessee state line.

Tennessee

US 23 runs concurrently with the newly upgraded I-26 from the North Carolina state line past Johnson City and Kingsport. Just west of Kingsport, I-26 stops at the junction with U.S. Route 11W, and US 23 continues to run north to the Virginia State Line.

Virginia

US 23 extends for  through far Southwest Virginia with the southern point beginning at Weber City and the northern point ending at Pound. It runs concurrent with US 58 and US 421 from Gate City to Duffield. It crosses the Clinch River near Clinchport. From Duffield to Big Stone Gap, it passes through the Jefferson National Forest. The entire route is a four-lane divided highway. The stretch of highway is known as The Crooked Road: Virginia's Heritage Music Trail and is a symbol of the highway's importance to country music.

US 23 passes by the following towns, cities and counties in Virginia as well:  Gate City in Scott County, Norton (an independent city), Big Stone Gap in Wise County and Pound, also located in Wise County.

Kentucky

US 23 is known as the "Country Music Highway" as it enters Kentucky from Virginia after crossing Pound Gap near Whitesburg. Loretta Lynn, Dwight Yoakam, Billy Ray Cyrus, Patty Loveless, Crystal Gayle, Chris Stapleton, Hylo Brown, and more are all noted along US 23's path through Kentucky. US 23 combines with US 119 near Pikeville and continues northward. Just south of Pikeville, it joins US 460 and Kentucky Route 80 (KY 80). It then passes through the Pikeville Cut-Through and US 119 diverges from the route near Coal Run Village. KY 80 splits to the south from US 23 near Prestonsburg, and US 460 splits to the west in Paintsville. US 23 then passes through the outer edge of Louisa and intersects I-64 in Catlettsburg. The highway also begins to run concurrently with US 60 from Catlettsburg to Ashland.

In Ashland, US 23 follows Winchester Avenue and then Greenup Avenue through downtown. Winchester Avenue continues north from 33rd Street as US 23 Business until rejoining US 23 at 6th Street. From here US 23 passes the Ashland Town Center Mall and the Melody Mountain shopping district before exiting the city limits. Continuing north near Bellefonte, the highway passes AK Steel's Ashland Works then enters Greenup County. It passes several shopping centers and downtown Russell and then briefly enters Flatwoods before entering Raceland along the southern banks of the Ohio River.  After passing through the cities of Wurtland, Greenup and South Shore, the highway crosses the Ohio River at South Portsmouth and enters Ohio at Portsmouth.

Since 1999, the entire Kentucky portion is a four-lane divided highway; in some of the larger cities, there are additional traffic lanes present in both directions. In northeastern Kentucky, from the I-64 junction north into Ohio, some sections are four-lanes undivided, with a double yellow line instead of a median.  These are the oldest four-lane sections of US 23 in Kentucky which were upgraded in 1950s and 1960s before divided highways became the design standard. They can be found on US 23 in the cities of Catlettsburg, Ashland, and Russell.

Ohio

The majority of US 23 in Ohio is a divided expressway, with the exception of downtown Columbus and the portion of the route between Carey and US 20 east of Perrysburg.

US 23 crosses the Ohio River from Kentucky and enters Portsmouth and passes through the towns of Lucasville, Piketon, Waverly, Chillicothe, and Circleville, before reaching Columbus. The highway then mostly follows High Street in Columbus, which was the original route. However, it now bypasses the central business district and northern Columbus neighborhoods by following the one-way pairing of 4th Street (northbound) and 3rd/Summit Street (southbound) between the downtown area and Hudson Street, and Indianola Avenue north before returning to its original course on High Street at Morse Road. US 23 then follows High Street northbound from Columbus, going through Worthington, passing the village of Lewis Center, entering Delaware at the Cheshire Road intersection. After US 23 intersects the northern terminus of SR 315 and passes a retail district, it becomes a limited-access freeway, bypassing downtown Delaware, before resuming as an expressway with at-grade crossings north of the city.

At Waldo, US 23 again becomes a freeway. It continues as a freeway throughout most of Marion County, then resumes at-grade crossings with a mix of some freeway-style junctions which are otherwise signalized after the Morral interchange. US 23 runs concurrently with divided SR 15 until it takes a different route at the Carey exit. SR 15 continues on to Findlay and is designed to allow most traffic to bypass the northern stretch of US 23 by offering a fast connection to I-75. US 23 continues north through Carey, Fostoria, and Risingsun.

West of Woodville, US 23 intersects US 20, where it has an overlap for several miles. US 23 then joins I-75 near Perrysburg, then follows I-475 around the west side of Toledo, passing through Sylvania before entering Michigan.  In the portion where I-75 and US 23 overlap, this is a wrong-way concurrency, with southbound I-75 concurrent with northbound US 23, and northbound I-75 concurrent with southbound US 23 in this stretch.

US 23 passes near the birthplace of President Rutherford B. Hayes in Delaware, as well as near the home of President Warren G. Harding in Marion.

Michigan

US 23 is a freeway bypass for I-75 west of Detroit, and then the Sunrise Side Coastal Highway along the shore of Lake Huron to its end at Mackinaw City. From the state line north, US 23 passes through the Ann Arbor area, bypassing that city to the east and north; US 23  intersects I-94 southeast of downtown. Further north, US 23 intersects I-96 north of Brighton and then overlaps I-75 starting at an interchange south of Flint. The combined freeway then junctions with I-69 in downtown Flint. US 23 breaks from I-75 south of Standish, becoming a two-lane road. US 23 then goes north following Lake Huron and ends at an intersection with I-75 in Mackinaw City.

History

Originally known as the Columbus–Sandusky Turnpike, the road was laid out about 1820.  Within four years it was noted as having frequent use, although it was in poor condition.  As a result, on February 10, 1824, James Kilbourne of the Ohio House of Representatives introduced a petition to revise and correct the state road leading from Columbus and Worthington to Delaware, Norton and further north.  Kilbourne believed that the Sandusky Bay was the perfect place for a harbor to open up the Ohio marketplace to New England.  He fought relentlessly to establish roads from the capital to Sandusky.  He laid out a southern extension of the road to tie Portsmouth on the Ohio River to the central and northern parts of the state.  As a result of Kilbourne's efforts, the State of Ohio chartered the Columbus and Sandusky Turnpike Company on January 31, 1826.  The following year the federal government gave  in trust to the state of Ohio for the turnpike company to finance road improvements and development.

An 1820 map of Ohio shows the turnpike leading from Columbus to Worthington, through Delaware into Marion County.  The southern portion of the improved road was built and in use by 1828.  The Columbus-Sandusky Turnpike, also sometimes known as Kilbourne Highway, was completed to Sandusky in 1834.  Although the Turnpike was much needed and well traveled, the Columbus and Sandusky Turnpike Company did not have the funds to maintain the road.  Early maps show the route as "Mud Pike."  Angry at the poor, muddy condition of the road, particularly in the rainiest seasons, travelers occasionally destroyed tollgates.  The Columbus and Sandusky Turnpike Company was disbanded February 28, 1843 when the Ohio legislature repealed the act that incorporated it.  Two years later an act was passed that established the road as a public highway.

US 23 was established in 1926 as part of the original U.S. highway system. The original route began at US 52 in Portsmouth, Ohio, and followed the old turnpike north to Sandusky, where it continued north to end at US 31 in Mackinaw City, Michigan.

In 1929, US 23 was extended from Portsmouth, Ohio into Kentucky, ending at Pikeville. The following highways form the original route of US 23:
Former U.S. Highway 23 Business through Pikeville
Kentucky Route 1428, Allen to Prestonsburg
Kentucky Route 321, Prestonsburg to north of Paintsville
Kentucky Route 2565 into Louisa from the south
Kentucky Route 3, Louisa to south of Catlettsburg
Kentucky Route 3294, Catlettsburg

The southern terminus remained in Pikeville for only two years. In 1930, US 23 was extended to Atlanta.

US 23 was extended into Florida along U.S. Route 1 in 1951. When the 20th Street Expressway was built around downtown Jacksonville, U.S. Route 1 was moved but US 23 remained. It has never changed its route in Florida, though at one time it was planned to extend south, maybe to Fort Myers via US 17, SR 19, SR 33, US 98, US 17, and SR 31.

In the mid to late 20th century when the coal industry declined in the Appalachian Mountains, US 23 was often dubbed the Hillbilly Highway, and it was said the three "R's" of the region were "reading, writing and Route 23", as workers migrated to northern industrial cities such as Detroit, Cleveland, Columbus, or Chicago. The Dwight Yoakam song "Readin', Rightin', RT.23" and the Steve Earle song "Hillbilly Highway" in particular reflect this heritage.

In 1985, US 23 was upgraded to interstate standards on the initiative of Eddie Williams, chief executive officer of economic development for Johnson City, Jonesborough and Washington County, Tenn.  "The original idea for that project happened in 1985, when two young men [later named as Don Kiel and Alan Bridwell] walked into my office with a plan to upgrade Highway 23 to interstate standards," Williams said. "And all it cost us was to change the signs."  Later that year, a section of US 23 near Johnson City was designated as I-181, the first section of US 23 to be designated as an interstate in either Tennessee or North Carolina.  Williams claims that this project was a catalyst for the five-state I-26 extension project.

On March 1, 1994, a bill sponsored by State Representative Hubert Collins was passed by the Kentucky State Legislature. This bill allowed US 23 to become known as "The Country Music Highway" in order to recognize all the country music stars that had come from the counties the highway passed through. At every county line there is a sign that lists the country music star or stars from that county. Also, in the early 2000s, the U.S. 23 Country Music Highway Museum opened in Paintsville to further commemorate these legendary people.

Law enforcement officials from Ohio and Kentucky set up the "US Route 23 Drug Taskforce" in 1996 to patrol the highway for drug trafficking, attempting to halt a major artery of drug networks bringing high-quality cannabis grown in Kentucky north for distribution in Ohio and elsewhere. Lately, it has been primarily used to stop the flow of narcotics from large cities like Columbus, OH, Dayton, OH, and Cleveland, OH into Portsmouth, OH, all of which have to pass through US 23 to reach Portsmouth.  Signs can be spotted along Route 23 in Ohio from Portsmouth to Columbus warning traffickers that efforts have been taken to prevent their actions. Some random police stings have been set up at portions of the highway.

During the past few years the highway has been widened to four or more lanes through its entire length within Kentucky and is one of the more scenic routes in Kentucky.  It is six lanes in parts of the city of Pikeville.  In 2002, it was officially named a National Scenic Byway.

US 23 also gains attention during college football season as it holds a direct connection between Ann Arbor, Michigan (home of the University of Michigan) and Columbus, Ohio (site of Ohio State University) and the Michigan–Ohio State football rivalry. Each year at the end of November a convoy of fans travels either north or south depending on where that year's game is being held. Unsubstantiated rumors that the host state of that year's game has their state police (either the Michigan State Police or Ohio State Highway Patrol) force an increase enforcement of traffic laws along the route in their respective states to cite opposing fans adds to the rivalry.

Major intersections
Florida
  in Jacksonville. US 17/US 23 travel concurrently through the city.
  in Jacksonville
  in Jacksonville. The highways travel concurrently to north of Alma, Georgia.
  in Jacksonville
  in Callahan. The highways travel concurrently to Homeland, Georgia.
Georgia
  in Waycross. The highways travel concurrently to west of Deenwood.
  in Waycross. The highways travel concurrently through the city.
  in Hazlehurst. The highways travel concurrently to Eastman.
  in Hazlehurst. The highways travel concurrently through the city.
  in McRae
  in Smithsonia
  east of Macon. The highways travel concurrently to Macon.
  in Macon. The highways travel concurrently through the city.
  in Macon
  in Macon
  in Macon
  northwest of Macon
  south-southwest of Rex
  north of Conley
  on the East Atlanta–Edgewood neighborhood line
  on the Poncey-Highland–Atkins Park neighborhood line. US 23/US 29/US 78 travel concurrently to Decatur. US 23/US 278 travel concurrently to Druid Hills.
  on the North Druid Hills–Brookhaven city line
  in Doraville
  in Buford. The highways travel concurrently to Gainesville.
  in Gainesville. The highways travel concurrently through the city.
  northwest of Cornelia. The highways travel concurrently to north-northwest of Dillsboro, North Carolina.
  east-southeast of Clarkesville
  in Clayton. The highways travel concurrently through the city.
North Carolina
  in Franklin. The highways travel concurrently around the southeastern edge of the city.
  north-northwest of Dillsboro. US 23/US 74 travel concurrently to west of Clyde.
  in Waynesville
  in Lake Junaluska. The highways travel concurrently to northeast of Mars Hill.
  in Asheville
  in Asheville. I-26/US 23 travel concurrently to northeast of Mars Hill. I-240 travel concurrently through the city.
  in Asheville. US 23/US 70 travel concurrently to Weaverville.
  in Woodfin. The highways travel concurrently to Weaverville.
Tennessee
  northeast of Ernestville. The highways travel concurrently to Johnson City.
  in Johnson City
  in Johnson City.
  in Kingsport
  in Kingsport
Virginia
  in Weber City. The highways travel concurrently to Duffield.
Kentucky
  southeast of Jenkins. The highways travel concurrently to Pikeville.
  in Pikeville. The highways travel concurrently to Staffordsville.
  south-southwest of Catlettsburg
  in Catlettsburg. The highways travel concurrently to Ashland.
Ohio
  in Portsmouth
  in Scioto Township
  in Scioto Township. The highways travel concurrently through the township.
  in Circleville
  in Hamilton Township
  in Columbus. The highways travel concurrently through the city.
  in Columbus. The highways travel concurrently through the city.
  in Columbus
  in Columbus
  in Columbus
  in Delaware. The highways travel concurrently through the city.
  in Delaware
  in Crane Township. The highways travel concurrently to Salem Township.
  in Loudon Township.
  on the Montgomery–Scott–Freedom–Madison township line
  on the Troy–Woodville township line. The highways travel concurrently to Perrysburg.
  in Perrysburg. I-75/US 23 travel concurrently through the city.
  in Perrysburg. The highways travel concurrently to Sylvania Township.
  in Maumee
  in Sylvania Township
  in Sylvania. The highways travel concurrently to Whiteford Township, Michigan.
Michigan
  in Pittsfield Charter Township
  in Ann Arbor
  in Brighton
  in Mundy Township. The highways travel concurrently to Lincoln Township.
  in Flint Township
  in Mount Morris Township
  in Buena Vista Charter Township
  in Zilwaukee Township
  in Monitor Township
  in Mackinaw City

See also

U.S. Route 123
U.S. Route 223
Special routes of U.S. Route 23

References

External links

 Endpoints of US 23

 
23
023